2010: The Year We Make Contact (abbreviated on-screen as simply 2010) is a 1984 American science fiction film written, produced, shot and directed by Peter Hyams. It is a sequel to Stanley Kubrick's 1968 film 2001: A Space Odyssey and is based on Arthur C. Clarke's 1982 sequel novel, 2010: Odyssey Two. The film stars Roy Scheider, Helen Mirren, Bob Balaban and John Lithgow, along with Keir Dullea and Douglas Rain of the cast of the previous film.

Plot

Nine years after the failure of the Discovery One mission to Jupiter in 2001, in which the crew of five including mission commander David Bowman were lost, an international dispute causes tension between the United States and the Soviet Union while both nations prepare space missions to determine what happened to the Discovery. The Soviet spacecraft Leonov will be ready a year before the American Discovery Two, but the Soviets need Americans to board the Discovery and reactivate the ship's sentient computer, HAL 9000, apparently responsible for the disaster. Upon learning that Discovery will crash into Jupiter's moon Io before the American mission can launch, Dr. Heywood Floyd, Discovery designer Walter Curnow, and HAL 9000's creator Dr. Chandra are permitted to join the Soviet mission.

Arriving at Jupiter, the crew detects organic molecules on Jupiter's icy moon Europa. A probe sent to investigate is destroyed by an energy burst, which the Soviets believe to be electrostatic build-up, but which Floyd suspects is a warning to stay away from Europa. Finding Discovery adrift in orbit over Io, Curnow reactivates the ship, and Chandra restarts HAL. Cosmonaut Max Brailovsky investigates the nearby giant Monolith at which Bowman disappeared while exploring, but the Monolith destroys his EVA pod with a burst of energy, killing him.

On Earth, Dave Bowman, now an incorporeal being, appears through his former wife's television to say goodbye, telling her that "something wonderful" is going to happen. He then visits his comatose mother in a nursing home. She briefly awakens in delight at her son's presence, before dying peacefully.

Chandra discovers the reasons for HAL's malfunction: the National Security Council ordered HAL to conceal information about the Monolith from the Discoverys crew and programmed him to complete the mission alone; this conflicted with HAL's programming of open, accurate processing of information, causing the computer equivalent of a paranoid mental breakdown. When Bowman and copilot Frank Poole discussed deactivating the malfunctioning computer, HAL judged that the human crew was endangering the mission, and terminated them. Although the NSC's order bears his signature, Floyd angrily denies having known of it.

Back on Earth, the United States and the Soviet Union are on the brink of war. The Americans are ordered to leave the Leonov and move to the Discovery, with no further communication between the crews. Both ships plan to leave Jupiter in several weeks' time, but Bowman appears to Floyd, and says that everyone must leave within two days. Floyd confers with the skeptical Soviet captain, Tanya Kirbuk. The crews agree to cooperate for an emergency departure when the Monolith suddenly disappears, and a growing black spot appears in Jupiter's atmosphere. Neither ship has the fuel to reach Earth if they leave ahead of schedule, so the ships are docked together, and placed under the control of HAL 9000. Discoverys remaining fuel will be burned to propel the Leonov away from Jupiter; then Discovery will be undocked and left behind.

HAL determines that the spot is a vast group of Monoliths, multiplying exponentially and altering Jupiter's density and chemical composition. He suggests canceling the launch in order to study the changes occurring to Jupiter. Floyd worries that HAL will prioritize his mission over the humans' survival, but Chandra admits to the computer that there is a danger, and that Discovery may be destroyed. HAL thanks Chandra for telling him the truth, and ensures the Leonovs escape. Before Discovery is destroyed, Bowman asks HAL to transmit a priority message, assuring him that they will soon be together. The Monoliths engulf Jupiter, which undergoes nuclear fusion, becoming a new star. HAL transmits this message to Earth:

The Leonov survives the shockwave from Jupiter's ignition, and returns home. Floyd narrates how the new star's miraculous appearance, and the message from a mysterious alien power, inspire the American and Soviet leaders to seek peace. Under its infant sun, icy Europa transforms into a humid jungle, covered with life, and watched over by a Monolith.

Cast

In addition, background crew members on the Leonov are played by Victor Steinbach and Jan Triska, while Herta Ware briefly appears as Bowman's mother. Candice Bergen, credited as "Olga Mallsnerd", voices the SAL 9000.

Arthur C. Clarke, author of the novels for 2001 and 2010, appears as a man on a park bench feeding pigeons outside the White House (visible in the letterboxed and widescreen versions). In addition, a Time magazine cover about the American–Soviet tension is briefly shown, in which the President of the United States is portrayed by Clarke and the Soviet Premier by the 2001 film's writer, producer and director, Stanley Kubrick.

Production

Development and filming
When Clarke published his novel 2010: Odyssey Two in 1982, he telephoned Stanley Kubrick, and jokingly said, "Your job is to stop anybody [from] making it [into a movie] so I won't be bothered." Metro-Goldwyn-Mayer subsequently worked out a contract to make a film adaptation, but Kubrick had no interest in directing it. However, Peter Hyams was interested and contacted both Clarke and Kubrick for their blessings:

While he was writing the screenplay in 1983, Hyams (in Los Angeles) began communicating with Clarke (in Sri Lanka) via the then-pioneering medium of e-mail using Kaypro II computers and direct-dial modems. They discussed the planning and production of the film almost daily using this method, and their informal, often humorous correspondence was published in 1984 as The Odyssey File. As it focuses on the screenwriting and pre-production process, the book terminates on February 7, 1984, just before the movie is about to start filming, though it does include 16 pages of behind-the-scenes photographs from the film.

Principal photography on the film began in February 1984 for a 71-day schedule. The majority of the film was shot on MGM's soundstages in Culver City, California, with the exception of a week of location work in Washington, D.C., Rancho Palos Verdes, California, and at the Very Large Array in New Mexico. Originally, Hyams had intended to film the opening scene at the Arecibo Observatory in Puerto Rico, home of the world's largest radio telescope, but after visiting there in 1983, he told Clarke that the site was "truly filthy" and unsuitable for filming.

Video Image (also known as VIFX), which would go on to work on a number of major pictures and briefly become 20th Century Fox's in-house visual effects studio, did its first work on this film, designing the video screen graphics.

Music
Initially, Tony Banks, keyboardist for the band Genesis, was commissioned to do the soundtrack for 2010: The Year We Make Contact. However, Banks' material was rejected and David Shire was then selected to compose the soundtrack, which he co-produced along with Craig Huxley. The soundtrack album was released by A&M Records.

Unlike many film soundtracks up until then, the soundtrack for 2010: The Year We Make Contact was composed for and played mainly using digital synthesizers. These included the Synclavier by the New England Digital company and a Yamaha DX1. Only two compositions on the soundtrack album feature a symphony orchestra. Shire and Huxley were so impressed by the realistic sound of the Synclavier that they placed a disclaimer in the album's liner notes stating "No re-synthesis or sampling was employed on the Synclavier."

Andy Summers, guitarist for the band The Police, performed a track entitled "2010", which was a modern new-wave pop version of Richard Strauss's Also Sprach Zarathustra (which had been the main theme from 2001: A Space Odyssey). Though Summers' recording was included on the soundtrack album and released as a single, it was not used in the film. For the B-side to the single, Summers recorded another 2010-based track entitled "To Hal and Back", though this appeared in neither the film nor the soundtrack album.

Release

Box office
2010: The Year We Make Contact debuted at number two at the North American box office, taking $7,393,361 for its opening weekend. It was held off from the top spot by Beverly Hills Cop, which became that year's highest-grossing film in North America. During its second week, the film faced competition from two other new sci-fi films; John Carpenter's Starman and David Lynch's Dune, but ultimately outgrossed both by the end of its domestic theatrical run. It finished with just over $40 million at the domestic box office and was the 17th-highest-grossing film in North America to be released in 1984.

Comic book
In 1984, Marvel Comics published a 48-page comic book adaptation of the film by writer J. M. DeMatteis and artists Joe Barney, Larry Hama and Tom Palmer. It was published both as a single volume in Marvel Super Special #37 and as a two-issue miniseries.

Home media
2010: The Year We Make Contact was first released on home video and laserdisc in 1985, and on DVD (R1) in 1998 by MGM. It was re-issued (with different artwork) in September 2000. Both releases are presented with the soundtrack remastered in Dolby 5.1 surround sound and in the original 2.35:1 aspect ratio, though a packaging error appears on the 2000 Warner release, claiming that the film is presented in anamorphic widescreen when, in reality, it is simply 4:3 letterboxed and not anamorphic (the MGM version of the DVD makes no such claim). The R1 and R4 releases also include the film trailer and a 10-minute behind-the-scenes featurette 2010: The Odyssey Continues (made at the time of the film's production), though this is not available in other regions.

The film was released on Blu-ray Disc on April 7, 2009. It features a BD-25 single-layer presentation, now in high-definition 16:9 (2.40:1) widescreen with 1080p/VC-1 video and English Dolby TrueHD 5.1 Surround audio. In all regions, the disc also includes the film's original "making of" promotional featurette (as above) and theatrical trailer in standard definition as extras.

Reception

Critical reception
Critical reaction to 2010: The Year We Make Contact was generally positive. It holds a 66% "Fresh" rating with an average score of 5.78/10 on Rotten Tomatoes, based on 35 reviews. The critical consensus reads, "2010 struggles to escape from the shadow of its monolithic predecessor, but offers brainy adventure in a more straightforward voyage through the cosmos." Roger Ebert gave 2010: The Year We Make Contact three stars out of four, writing that "It doesn't match the poetry and the mystery of the original film, but it does continue the story, and it offers sound, pragmatic explanations for many of the strange and visionary things in 2001." Ebert also wrote it "has an ending that is infuriating, not only in its simplicity, but in its inadequacy to fulfill the sense of anticipation, the sense of wonder we felt at the end of 2001". He concluded, however: "And yet the truth must be told: This is a good movie. Once we've drawn our lines, once we've made it absolutely clear that 2001 continues to stand absolutely alone as one of the greatest movies ever made, once we have freed 2010 of the comparisons with Kubrick's masterpiece, what we are left with is a good-looking, sharp-edged, entertaining, exciting space opera".

James Berardinelli also gave the film three stars out of four, writing that "2010 continues 2001 without ruining it. The greatest danger faced by filmmakers helming a sequel is that a bad installment will in some way sour the experience of watching the previous movie. This does not happen here. Almost paradoxically, 2010 may be unnecessary, but it is nevertheless a worthwhile effort." Vincent Canby gave 2010: The Year We Make Contact a lukewarm review, calling it "a perfectly adequate though not really comparable sequel" that "is without wit, which is not to say that it is witless. A lot of care has gone into it, but it has no satirical substructure to match that of the Kubrick film, and which was eventually responsible for that film's continuing popularity."

Colin Greenland reviewed 2010 for Imagine magazine, calling it "a tense space drama with excellent performances from Helen Mirren and John Lithgow, and glorious special effects. For everyone who was mystified by 2001."

Awards and nominations
2010: The Year We Make Contact was nominated for five Academy Awards:
 Best Art Direction (Art Direction: Albert Brenner; Set Decoration: Rick Simpson)
 Best Costume Design (Patricia Norris)
 Best Makeup (Michael Westmore)
 Best Sound (Michael J. Kohut, Aaron Rochin, Carlos Delarios and Gene Cantamessa)
 Best Visual Effects (Richard Edlund, Neil Krepela, George Jenson and Mark Stetson)

The film was also nominated for three Saturn Awards; Best Science Fiction Film, Best Costumes (Patricia Norris), and Best Special Effects (Richard Edlund). It won the Hugo Award for Best Dramatic Presentation in 1985.

See also
 The Bamboo Saucer, a 1968 film where Soviet and American teams collaborate on the recovery of a flying saucer.

References

External links

 
 
 
 
 

Space Odyssey
Adaptations of works by Arthur C. Clarke
1984 films
1984 drama films
1980s science fiction adventure films
American science fiction adventure films
American science fiction drama films
American sequel films
American space adventure films
1980s English-language films
Fiction set on Europa (moon)
Films about astronauts
Films adapted into comics
Films directed by Peter Hyams
Films based on science fiction novels
Films set in 2010
Films set in the future
Films shot in Los Angeles County, California
Films shot in New Mexico
Films shot in Washington, D.C.
Films scored by David Shire
Hugo Award for Best Dramatic Presentation winning works
Fiction set on Io (moon)
Jupiter in film
Metro-Goldwyn-Mayer films
Fiction set on Jupiter's moons
Films with screenplays by Peter Hyams
Hard science fiction films
1980s American films